Isabel Durant (born 21 December 1991), sometimes credited as Issi Durant, is an Australian actress and dancer. She is known for her roles as Grace Whitney in Dance Academy (2012–2013), Ondina the mermaid in Mako: Island of Secrets (2015–2016) and Claire Brady in Days of Our Lives (2020–2021).

Life and career
Durant is from Sydney, Australia. She began seriously dancing at age 15 while a student at Loreto Kirribilli.

Durant appeared on and was a Top 20 finalist on the third season of So You Think You Can Dance Australia. Following her elimination from So You Think You Can Dance Australia, she went to open auditions for the teen drama series Dance Academy and was cast in the role of troublemaker Grace Whitney for the show's second season, a role she continued playing into the series' third season. She also appeared in three episodes of American-Australian comedy-drama television series Camp which aired on NBC in 2013.

In 2014, Durant joined the cast of Mako: Island of Secrets with its second season, playing mermaid Ondina, staying on with the show through its third season. In August 2020, it was announced that Durant had joined the cast of American soap opera Days of Our Lives, taking over the recurring role of Claire Brady.  On September 10, 2020, she was promoted to a contract player.

Filmography

References

External links

 
 

Australian television actresses
Living people
1991 births
Actresses from Sydney
Australian female dancers
So You Think You Can Dance Australia contestants